Geert ten Dam (born Eindhoven, 6 November 1958) is a Dutch scientist. She is the President of the University of Amsterdam.

References 

Academic staff of the University of Amsterdam
Dutch women scientists
Living people
1958 births
People from Eindhoven
20th-century Dutch scientists
20th-century women scientists
21st-century Dutch scientists
21st-century women scientists
Women heads of universities and colleges
20th-century Dutch women